
Gmina Wolanów is a rural gmina (administrative district) in Radom County, Masovian Voivodeship, in east-central Poland. Its seat is the village of Wolanów, which lies approximately 12 kilometres (7 mi) south-west of Radom and 95 km (59 mi) south of Warsaw.

Villages
Gmina Wolanów contains the villages and settlements of Bieniędzice, Chruślice, Franciszków, Garno, Jarosławice, Kacprowice, Kolonia Wolanów, Kowala-Duszocina, Kowalanka, Młodocin Większy, Mniszek, Podlesie, Rogowa, Sławno, Ślepowron, Strzałków, Wacławów, Waliny, Wawrzyszów, Wolanów, Wymysłów and Zabłocie.

Neighbouring gminas
Gmina Wolanów is bordered by the city of Radom and by the gminas of Jastrząb, Kowala, Orońsko, Przytyk, Wieniawa and Zakrzew.

References
Polish official population figures 2006

Wolanow
Radom County